San Simon, officially the Municipality of San Simon, is a 3rd class municipality in the province of Pampanga, Philippines. According to the 2020 census, it has a population of 59,182 people.

San Simon is accessible via the North Luzon Expressway via the San Simon current exit.

History 
In 1770, Don Mariano del Pilar de los Reyes founded a farming village named 'Barrio Del Pilar', which later became the town of San Simon. The village was located between the towns of San Luis in the north and Apalit in the south. As the population of the village kept on growing, the village leaders of that time petitioned to consolidate the village and portions of the towns of San Luis and Apalit, to form an independent pueblo (town).

On November 15, 1771, Don Simón de Anda y Salazar, the governor general of the Philippines at that time, approved the official creation of the town. The town was named after the Spanish governor general who approved its creation and of the Apostle Simon Peter, the patron saint of Apalit.

In 1898, the retreating forces of General Antonio Luna, on their way to Nueva Ecija, burned the town's parish church. The church was only rebuilt after almost a century in 1979.

In 1904, San Simon was merged with San Luis but only for three years. In 1920, the geographical boundaries of the towns of Apalit, San Luis, and Simon are officially established.

By the year 1835, San Simon had eight barrios (barangay). But in the late 1940s, the population grew and the number of barrios were increased to fourteen, which has been maintained until the present times.

Geography

Barangays
San Simon is politically subdivided into 14 barangays.

 Concepcion
 De La Paz
 San Juan (Poblacion)
 San Agustin
 San Isidro
 San Jose
 San Miguel
 San Nicolas
 San Pablo Libutad
 San Pablo Proper
 San Pedro
 Santa Cruz
 Santa Monica
 Santo Niño

Climate

Demographics

Religion 
The Roman Catholic Archdiocese of San Fernando has jurisdiction over the 1771 Virgen del Pilar Parish Church.

Like most Kapampangan people, residents of San Simon retain their Kapampangan language and traditional culture and arts brought about by their Malay ancestors and enriched by Chinese, Spanish, American, Japanese and other ethnic and foreign cultures. Religious affiliations are:
Catholic 80%
Members Church of God International 10%
Iglesia ni Cristo 7%
others 3%

Economy 

The principal industries in San Simon are farming, fishing and poultry and swine industries. There are two public markets in San Simon, one in the old poblacion area and another one located in the industrial zone area.

Government

San Simon is governed by a mayor and vice mayor who are elected to three-year terms. The mayor is the executive head and leads the town's departments in executing the ordinances and improving public services. The vice mayor heads a legislative council (Sangguniang Bayan) consisting of councilors from the barangays of barrios.

List of local chief executives 

Available records at the Municipal Hall list the following town executives from 1898 until present:

Education
For elementary and high school education, residents of San Simon are served by thirteen elementary schools, two barangay public high schools, and three private schools.
For Example:
Assumpta Technical High School (ATHS)
Pampanga Central High School (PCHS)
St. Augustine Institute of Pampanga (SAIP)
San Simon High School (SSHS)
San Pedro Elementary School (SPES)
San Pedro National High School (SPNHS)
Next Generation Technological College
Dela Paz Libutad High School

Communications
For telecommunications, the town is served by Digitel, PLDT, PILTEL, DATELCOM, SMART, GLOBE and with new copper line CONVERGE ICT.

Gallery

References

External links

 San Simon Profile at PhilAtlas.com
 [ Philippine Standard Geographic Code]
Philippine Census Information
Local Governance Performance Management System
Official Website

Municipalities of Pampanga
Populated places on the Pampanga River